This is a complete list of fellows of the Royal Society elected in 1911.

Fellows
Evelyn Baring
Howard Turner Barnes
Adrian John Brown
Julius Berend Cohen
Walter Ernest Dixon
Frederick George Donnan
Edmond Herbert Grove-Hills
William Henry Lang
John Beresford Leathes
Edward Alfred Minchin
Robert Muir
Richard Dixon Oldham
Reginald Innes Pocock
Alfred William Porter
Herbert William Richmond
Lionel Walter Rothschild
George Gerald Stoney

Foreign members 

Jons Oskar Backlund
Joseph Achille Le Bel
Paul Heinrich Ritter von Groth
Heinrich Johannes Gustav Kayser
Clement Arkadevich Timiriazeff

See also
List of Fellows of the Royal Society

References

1911
1911 in science
1911 in the United Kingdom